Härkönen is a Finnish surname. Notable people with the surname include:

Armas Härkönen (1903 - 1981), Finnish politician
Anna-Leena Härkönen (b. 1965), Finnish writer
Arto Härkönen (b. 1959), Finnish javelin thrower
Jorma Härkönen (b. 1956), Finnish runner
Kari Härkönen (b. 1959), Finnish cross country skier

See also
Harkonen (disambiguation)
Harkonnen (disambiguation)

Finnish-language surnames